Shyam Sunder Bansal is an Indian interventional cardiologist. He is also a Fellow of American College of Cardiology (FACC), Fellow of Society for Cardiovascular Angiography and Intervention (FSCAI) and the Chairman of SSB Heart & Multi-speciality Hospital. He has been awarded with the Rashtriya Gaurav Award and Ayushman Bharat Award.

Early life 
Shyam Sunder Bansal was born in Bhiwani, Haryana to Ram Jiwan Bansal and Tripta Bansal. He did his schooling at DAV College in Jalandhar, Punjab. Later, he completed his MBBS from Guru Nanak Dev University from 1982-1986 and MD from B.J. Medical College, Ahmedabad from 1988-1991. In 1994, Bansal received a Doctorate of Medicine (Cardiology) from B.J. Medical College, Ahmedabad and Diplomate of National Board of Cardiology. He is married to Seema Bansal, whom he met during his studies.

Career 
In 1994, Bansal started his practice at Escorts Hospital, Faridabad, where he established and headed the Department of Cardiology. In 2002, he started working with Metro Hospital, Faridabad, where he set up the first dedicated Heart Centre and first Cath Lab in Haryana. In October 2009, he started a hospital in Faridabad in partnership with Metro Group. He was the Managing Director of Metro Hospital, Faridabad for over a decade. In 2018, Bansal had a dispute and filed a complaint against Dr. Lal of the Metro Hospital, for fraudulent practices and duping various government departments. Following this, he left the Metro Hospital and started his own heart hospital in 2020. Currently, he is the chairman & managing director of the SSB Heart & Multi-speciality Hospital.

On 21 January, 2023, a 107-year old woman was reportedly admitted to SSB Heart and Multispeciality Hospital, Faridabad with a compain of severe chest pain. The patient underwent an angiography test, which revealed a blocked proximal left anterior descending artery. Dr. S S Bansal and his team successfully performed an angioplasty procedure to open up the blocked artery with a balloon and stent.

Publications

Awards and nominations 
 Rashtriya Gaurav Award in 2012 by Indian International Friendship Society for his contributions towards the health sector
 Ayushamn Bharat Award in 2020 by Minister of State in the Prime Minister's Office

References 

20th-century Indian medical doctors
Indian cardiologists
Medical doctors from Haryana
21st-century Indian medical doctors
Year of birth missing (living people)
Living people